Vaninsky District is an administrative and municipal district (raion), one of the seventeen in Khabarovsk Krai, Russia. It is located in the east of the krai. Its administrative center is the urban locality (a work settlement) of Vanino. Population:  The population of Vanino accounts for 45.6% of the district's total population.

References

Notes

Sources

Districts of Khabarovsk Krai